Zastava M19 is a modular 6.5/7.62 mm rifle, developed by the Zastava Arms, and has been adopted by the Serbian Armed Forces in 2020.

Description
M19, is based on the well-tested Kalashnikov principle, chambered in the 6.5 mm Grendel or 7.62×39 mm cartridge. The Zastava M19 is gas operated with a rotating bolt locking system. The reliability of functioning in different climatic and field conditions has been confirmed by strict testing methods in accordance with military standards. The M19 modular rifle, depending on the task and mission, can use 7.62 mm or 6.5 mm barrels. The modification is reflected in the construction of the cross latch on the receiver, which enables easy and quick replacement of the barrel, without disassembling the rifle and without using tools. In addition to barrels in different calibers, within a single caliber there are different barrel lengths (254 mm and 415 mm), which allows the rifle to quickly adapt to a variety of combat situations, so that basically the same rifle can be used as a submachine gun, assault rifle, light machine gun or designated marksman rifle. Changing the caliber of the rifle also requires changing the magazine, and the magazine are clearly marked and noticeably different. Magazine capacity for caliber 7.62×39 mm is 30 rounds and for caliber 6.5 mm magazine capacity can be 25 and 20 rounds.

It is equipped with complex aiming systems - day and reflex optical sight, as well as thermal sight, which significantly increases the efficiency of action at night. The temperature range functionality of the rifle is from -30°C to +50°C.

In line with modern assault rifle trends, the M19 has an integrated chest cover and gas chamber upper lining with a long "Picatinny" rail that accepts all types of optoelectronic sights, as well as a shutter-release handle that allows rehearsal with both left and right hands and a fire control on the left side of the handle suitable for handling.

The folding-telescopic buttstock has an adjustable cheek rest, the rear handle is ergonomically improved and with the front handle it allows a firmer and more stable grip, especially during burst firing. The frame holder button has been expanded to make it easier to remove and replace the frame.

Users

  - Used by Serbian Armed Forces

References

Extern links
 Modular Combat System - Zastava Arms
 New modular 6.5/7.62mm Zastava M19
Zastava Arms
Kalashnikov derivatives
M19
Weapons and ammunition introduced in 2020